The Embassy of Brazil in Moscow is the diplomatic mission of Brazil to the Russian Federation and to the Republic of Uzbekistan. Since 28th October 1963 the Embassy and the Residence of Brazilian Ambassador are located at 54 Bolshaya Nikitskaya Street in the Presnensky District of Moscow. 

The main unit in the embassy complex is also known as the Lopatina House, built in 1876. Designed by Alexander Kaminsky one of the most important Russian architect between 1860 a 1880, the construction is one of the first and still rare examples of civil construction in the city in a pseudo-Russian style, marked by references from traditional Russian culture before "Peter the Great" era.

From early 2019 to late 2020, due to restoration of the main building, the Residence of Brazilian Ambassador was temporarily settled at Tsvetkov's mansion (Особняк Цветкова)

See also
 Brazil–Russia relations
 Diplomatic missions in Russia

References

External links
 Official website of the Embassy of Brazil in Moscow  

Brazil
Moscow
Government buildings completed in 1875
Brazil–Russia relations